Andrew Graham Salter (born 1 June 1993) is a Welsh cricketer. Salter is a right-handed batsman who bowls right-arm off break. He was born at Haverfordwest, Pembrokeshire, and was educated at Milford Haven School.

Salter made his debut in county cricket for Wales Minor Counties against Wiltshire in the 2010 MCCA Knockout Trophy, and in that same season he made his debut in the Minor Counties Championship against Devon. In early 2011, he played four Youth One Day Internationals for England Under-19s against Sri Lanka Under-19s during England Under-19s tour there. While studying for a Higher National Diploma in Sport Coaching & Development at Cardiff Metropolitan University, Salter made his first-class debut for Cardiff MCC University in the team's inaugural appearance in first-class cricket against Somerset at Taunton Vale Sports Club Ground in 2012. He featured in a second first-class appearance in that season for Cardiff MCCU against Warwickshire at Edgbaston. He made his debut in county cricket for Glamorgan in a List A match against Durham in the 2012 Clydesdale Bank 40, making a further appearance in that competition against Nottinghamshire.

Salter managed to take a wicket with his very first career ball in the County Championship when he had Leicestershire's Shiv Thakor caught behind. In April 2022, in the opening round of matches in the 2022 County Championship, Salter took his maiden five-wicket haul in first-class cricket, with 7 for 45 against Durham.

References

External links
Andrew Salter at ESPNcricinfo
Andrew Salter at CricketArchive

1993 births
Living people
Sportspeople from Haverfordwest
Cricketers from Pembrokeshire
People educated at Milford Haven School
Alumni of Cardiff Metropolitan University
Welsh cricketers
Wales National County cricketers
Cardiff MCCU cricketers
Glamorgan cricketers